The National Farmers Association could refer to:

 Irish Farmers' Association
 National Farmers Association (Australia)